Revolutionary Road is a 2008 romantic drama film directed by Sam Mendes. The screenplay was written by Justin Haythe, adapted from the 1961 novel of the same name by Richard Yates. It stars Leonardo DiCaprio and Kate Winslet as Frank and April Wheeler, with Michael Shannon, Kathryn Hahn, David Harbour, and Kathy Bates in supporting roles. Set in the mid-1950s, the Wheelers struggle to cope with their personal problems and the ensuing breakdown in their marriage. Revolutionary Road is the second onscreen collaboration for DiCaprio, Winslet, and Bates, all of whom previously co-starred in 1997's Titanic.  The film soundtrack was composed by Thomas Newman, his fourth collaboration with Mendes.

Development of the film adaptation actually began in 1961. However, a lack of commercial prospects and disagreements with the screenplay caused the project to be in limbo until the 2000s. BBC Films eventually purchased the film rights to the novel and Haythe rewrote the screenplay. Winslet read the script and persuaded her then-husband Mendes to direct, and DiCaprio to play the role of Frank. Principal photography began in 2007, on location in Darien, Connecticut.

Revolutionary Road was released in the United States on December 26, 2008, followed by a wider international release in January 2009, and grossed $76 million at the worldwide box office. The film received positive reviews from critics, who lauded the performances of DiCaprio, Winslet and Shannon, as well as the faithfulness to the novel. For their performances, DiCaprio and Winslet earned Golden Globe nominations for Best Actor and Best Actress, respectively, of which Winslet won. The film also received three Academy Award nominations: Best Supporting Actor (Shannon), Best Art Direction and Best Costume Design.

Plot 
In 1948, Frank Wheeler (DiCaprio) meets April (Winslet) at a party. He is a longshoreman, hoping to be a cashier; she wants to be an actress. Frank later secures a sales position with Knox Machines, and he and April marry. The Wheelers move to 115 Revolutionary Road in suburban Connecticut when April becomes pregnant.

The couple become close friends with their realtor Helen Givings (Bates) and her husband Howard Givings (Easton), and neighbor Milly Campbell (Hahn) and her husband Shep (Harbour). To their friends, the Wheelers are the perfect couple, but their relationship is troubled. April fails to make a career out of acting, while Frank hates the tedium of his work. On his 30th birthday, Frank invites a secretary at work to have a drink with him at a bar. She accepts, becomes heavily intoxicated, and they end up having sex. Meanwhile, Helen has asked April if they will meet her son, John (Shannon), who had been in an insane asylum. She thinks the younger couple may be able to help her son with his condition. April accepts.

April wants a change of scenery and a chance to support the family so Frank can find his passion, so she suggests that they move to Paris to start a new life away from the "hopeless emptiness" of their lifestyle. Frank balks at the idea at first, but becomes convinced. Over the next several weeks, the Wheelers tell their various friends about their plans to live in Paris, but surprisingly, the only person who seems to comprehend their decision is John. 

As the couple prepares to move, they are forced to reconsider. Frank is offered a promotion, and April becomes pregnant again. When Frank discovers she is contemplating having an abortion, the couple have an altercation, in which April says that they had their second child only to prove the first child was not a "mistake". The next day, Frank takes the promotion and tries to accept his uneventful life. At the end of an evening at a jazz bar with the Campbells, Shep and April end up alone together. She confides in him of her depression over the canceled Paris plans and her life in general, and they end up having sex in the car. Shep professes his long-held love for April, but she rejects his interest.

The following day, Frank confesses to having had an affair, hoping to reconcile with April. To his surprise, April responds apathetically and tells him it does not matter, as her love for him has gone, which he does not believe. The Givings come over for dinner, and Frank announces to the guests that their plans have changed because April is pregnant. John lambasts Frank for crushing April's hope, as well as his acceptance of his circumstances. Angered, Frank nearly attacks John, and the Givings leave. Afterwards, Frank and April have an altercation, and April flees the house.

Frank spends the night in a drunken stupor. The next morning he is shocked to find April in the kitchen, calmly making breakfast. Frank, unsure of how to react, eats with her and then leaves for work. April then goes to the bathroom, where she—offscreen—performs a vacuum aspiration abortion on herself. Afterwards, she discovers she is bleeding and calls an ambulance. Frank arrives at the hospital, distraught, and is comforted by Shep. April dies in the hospital from blood loss. A guilty Frank moves to the city and starts selling computers. He spends his spare time with his children. 

A new couple, the Braces, buys their old home and Milly tells the story of the Wheelers to them. Shep stands up and walks out of the house, crying; he tells Milly to never talk about the Wheelers ever again. Helen talks to her husband, years later, about how the Braces seem to be the best-suited couple for the Wheelers' old house. When her husband mentions the Wheelers, Helen starts to explain why she did not like them. As she continues to elaborate, her husband turns off his hearing aid.

Cast 

 Kate Winslet as April Wheeler
 Leonardo DiCaprio as Frank Wheeler
 Michael Shannon as John Givings Jr.
 Kathryn Hahn as Milly Campbell
 David Harbour as Shep Campbell
 Kathy Bates as Helen Givings
 Ty Simpkins as Michael Wheeler
 Richard Easton as Howard Givings
 Ryan Simpkins as Jennifer Wheeler
 Dylan Baker as Jack Ordway
 Zoe Kazan as Maureen Grube
 Max Casella as Ed Small
 Jay O. Sanders as Bart Pollock
 John Behlmann as Mr. Brace
 Kristen Connolly as Mrs. Brace
 Catherine Curtin as Woman in Audience

Production

Development and casting 
In 1961, following the publication of Richard Yates' novel, director John Frankenheimer considered making the film, but opted to make The Manchurian Candidate, instead. Samuel Goldwyn Jr. expressed an interest in the film adaptation, but others in his studio told him that it lacked commercial prospects. Then in 1965, producer Albert S. Ruddy bought the rights but disliked the ending to the novel, and wanted to obscure April's death with "tricky camerawork". He became involved in adapting The Godfather and, five years later, while a writer-in-residence at Wichita State University, Yates offered to adapt his work for the screen. Ruddy was occupied by other projects at the time and demurred, eventually selling the rights to actor Patrick O'Neal. The actor praised the book and spent the rest of his life trying to finish a workable screenplay. Yates read O'Neal's treatment of his novel and found it "godawful", but O'Neal refused the writer's repeated offers to buy back the rights to the novel. Yates died in 1992, O'Neal two years later.

The project remained in limbo until 2001 when actor Todd Field expressed interest in adapting it for the screen. However, when told by the O'Neal estate he would be required to shoot O'Neal's script as written, Field changed his mind and went on to direct Little Children instead. Producer David Thompson eventually purchased the rights for BBC Films. In March 2007, BBC Films established a partnership with DreamWorks, and the rights to the film's distribution were transferred to DreamWorks' owner, Paramount Pictures. On February 14, 2008, Paramount's other division, Paramount Vantage, announced that it was "taking over distribution duties on Revolutionary Road". The BBC hired Justin Haythe to write the screenplay because, according to the screenwriter, he was "hugely affordable".

Kate Winslet received the screenplay from her agent, and then read the novel. She was impressed and even met with O'Neal's widow, Cynthia O'Neal, and discussed the film adaptation. Winslet sent the script to producer Scott Rudin, who suggested that her then-husband, Sam Mendes would be perfect as director. Winslet gave Mendes Yates' novel and said, "I really want to play this part". He read Haythe's script and then the book in quick succession. Haythe's first draft was very faithful to the novel, using large parts of Yates' own language, but Mendes told him to find ways to externalize what Frank and April do not say to each other.

Winslet sent the script to friend Leonardo DiCaprio, and persuaded him to take the part of Frank. DiCaprio was intrigued by the 1950s era and complexities of marriage; "The dynamic between Frank and April is so powerful and realistic, you feel like you're a fly on the wall watching an intimate relationship disintegrate,” he said. DiCaprio said that he saw his character as "unheroic" and "slightly cowardly", and that he was "willing to be just a product of his environment". On April 24, 2007, it was announced that Kathy Bates had joined the cast, along with David Harbour, Michael Shannon and Zoe Kazan. Kazan said she fought hard for the role of Maureen Grube, despite objections from casting director Debra Zane who thought she was too young.

To prepare for the role, Winslet read The Feminine Mystique by Betty Friedan. She said, "The hardest thing about playing April, honestly, was making a very specific choice to not have her being as mannered as she is in the book. In the book, she’s very, very highly strung and sometimes hysterical. She feels like a string that’s literally going to snap at any moment." DiCaprio prepared for the role by watching several documentaries about the 1950s and the origin of suburbs. He and Winslet have been reluctant since Titanic to co-star in projects that show them in a romantic relationship. DiCaprio said: "we just knew it would be a fundamental mistake to try to repeat any of those themes".

Filming 
In mid-2007, the cast rehearsed for three-and-a-half weeks before principal photography and shot mostly in sequence and on location in Darien, Connecticut. Mendes wanted to create a claustrophobic dynamic on set, so he filmed the Wheeler home interiors in a real house. The property, including the neighbor's house, were very small but featured 1950s-style architecture. The homeowners gave permission for DreamWorks to dismantle and remodel the interior and exterior. Around 45 tradespeople were involved with the transformation, including carpenters, interior designers and landscapers. Production designer Kristi Zea and her team had five weeks to renovate the homes. "We wanted to keep the sense of isolation that was described in the book", Zea said. Debra Schutt served as a set decorator, and said, "We ruled out anything with bright colors and anything that hit you over the head with the period. The look is really quite plain".

Cinematographer Roger Deakins, who previously worked on Mendes' Jarhead, shot with a combination of jib and handheld camera equipment. Deakins analyzed the use of every light fixture in the house; Schutt recalls "he’s quite specific about what he wants. For instance, for the night scene by the side of the road, he wanted streetlights that would give a rectangular, tapered light, and for an argument in the Wheelers’ front room, he wanted a ceiling fixture that would send light down and out in a fan shape with a hard edge". Period streetlights and automobiles were also fitted with specific light bulbs by the art department. Deakins found it difficult at times working in a small, shaded house with bulky camera equipment. Nevertheless, Winslet was impressed with his ability to "bounce light all over" using Arri Compact HMI lamps. To gradually illustrate the home's neglect and Wheelers' collapsing marriage, the crew removed props in the house and Deakins transitioned to handheld cameras, respectively. Mendes said, "I wanted a real rawness in Leo and Kate’s performances in the last half-hour of the movie, and when we reached that point, I told Roger I didn’t want to make any decisions [about shots]; I wanted it to be handheld, and I wanted to let the actors be explosive and unpredictable".

Recalling the on-set atmosphere, Michael Shannon said that he did not feel that there were any "stars", but "a group of people united by a passion for the material and wanting to honor the book". He said Winslet and DiCaprio could only make such a good performance as a couple because of their friendship since Titanic. For Shannon, it was more important to prepare for the moment when he walked on the set than being concerned about the actors he was working with. In the fight scenes between DiCaprio and Winslet, DiCaprio said, "So much of what happens between Frank and April in this film is what's left unsaid. I actually found it a real joy to do those fight scenes because finally, these people were letting each other have it". Winslet described her working relationship with DiCaprio as "challenging" and "physically comfortable", but she also felt "pressure" working with him, and working with her then-husband Mendes. She added, "the on-set atmosphere was very fluid in that way in that we’d all share ideas [...] without treading on each other’s toes". DiCaprio found the filming process physically and emotionally exhausting, that he postponed his next film for two months.

Once filming was complete, Deakins had the film negative (Kodak Vision2 200T 5217 and 500T 5218) processed at DuArt Film and Video in New York, one of his favorite laboratories in the area. During post-production, handled by EFILM, Mendes deleted around 20 minutes of footage to keep it in the spirit of Yates' novel.

Music 
Thomas Newman composed the soundtrack for Revolutionary Road; it is his fourth film score collaboration with Mendes. Consisting of fifteen tracks, Newman uses a variety of piano, strings, metallic sound effects and basslines for a haunting minimalist sound. The music was recorded at Newman Scoring Stage in Los Angeles and the album was released on December 23, 2008.

Release

Box office 
Revolutionary Road premiered in Los Angeles on December 15, 2008, followed by a limited U.S. release on December 26, 2008, and then a wider release (1,058 theaters) on January 23, 2009. In most other countries, it was released between January 15–30, 2009. The film earned $22.9 million at the domestic box office and $56.6 million internationally for a moderate worldwide $76 million.

Home media 
Revolutionary Road was released on DVD and Blu-ray on June 2, 2009. The Blu-ray edition includes an audio commentary by Mendes, 26-minutes of deleted scenes, and two documentaries on the development of the project.

Critical reception 

Revolutionary Road received generally positive reviews from critics. On the review aggregator Rotten Tomatoes, the film has an approval rating of 67% based on 215 reviews, with an average score of 6.60/10. The website's critical consensus reads, "Brilliantly acted and emotionally powerful, Revolutionary Road is a handsome adaptation of Richard Yates' celebrated novel". On Metacritic, the film has a weighted average score of 69 out of 100, based on 38 critics, indicating "generally favorable reviews".

Rex Reed of The New York Observer gave the film a positive response; "a flawless, moment-to-moment autopsy of a marriage on the rocks and an indictment of the American Dream gone sour" and "a profound, intelligent and deeply heartfelt work that raises the bar of filmmaking to exhilarating". Peter Travers of Rolling Stone called the film "raw and riveting" and commented, "Directed with extraordinary skill by Sam Mendes, who warms the chill in the Yates-faithful script by Justin Haythe, the film is a tough road well worth traveling ... DiCaprio is in peak form, bringing layers of buried emotion to a defeated man. And the glorious Winslet defines what makes an actress great, blazing commitment to a character and the range to make every nuance felt". Writing for the San Francisco Chronicle, Mick LaSalle said, "Finally, this is a movie that can and should be seen more than once. Watch it one time through her eyes. Watch it again through his eyes. It works both ways. It works in every way. This is a great American film".

Roger Ebert of the Chicago Sun-Times gave Revolutionary Road a maximum rating of four stars, commending the acting and screenplay and calling the film "so good it is devastating". Of DiCaprio and Winslet, he said, "they are so good, they stop being actors and become the people I grew up around". Entertainment Weekly's Owen Gleiberman graded the film B+ and commented, "The film is lavishly dark—some might say too dark—yet I'd suggest it has a different limitation: For all its shattering domestic discord, there's something remote and aestheticized about it. April brings a private well of conflict to her middle-class prison, but Winslet is so meticulous in her telegraphed despair that she intrigues us, moves us, yet never quite touches our unguarded nerves". Joe Neumaier of the New York Daily News said:

Some film critics gave a mixed response. David Ansen of Newsweek opined that it is "impeccably mounted—perhaps too much so. Mendes [...] has an innately theatrical style: everything pops off the screen a little bigger and bolder than life [...] Instead of losing myself in the story, I often felt on the outside looking in, appreciating the craftsmanship, but one step removed from the agony on display. Revolutionary Road is impressive, but it feels like a classic encased in amber". Kirk Honeycutt of The Hollywood Reporter described the film as a "didactic, emotionally overblown critique of the soulless suburbs", and thought it was a repeat of American Beauty. He wrote, "Once more, the suburbs are well-upholstered nightmares and its denizens clueless—other than one estranged male. Everything is boldly indicated to the audience from arch acting styles to the wink-wink, nod-nod of its design. Indeed his actors play the subtext with such fury that the text virtually disappears. Subtlety is not one of Mendes' strong suits".

Writing for Variety magazine, Todd McCarthy thought the film was "faithful, intelligent, admirably acted, superbly shot". He added, "It also offers a near-perfect case study of the ways in which film is incapable of capturing certain crucial literary qualities, in this case the very things that elevate the book from being a merely insightful study of a deteriorating marriage into a remarkable one [...] Even when the dramatic temperature is cranked up too high, the picture's underpinnings seem only partly present, to the point where one suspects that what it's reaching for dramatically might be all but unattainable—perhaps approachable only by Pinter at his peak." McCarthy later changed his opinion, calling Revolutionary Road "problematic" and that it "has some issues that just won't go away". He concludes that Revolutionary Road suffers in comparison to Billy Wilder's The Apartment and Richard Quine's Strangers When We Meet because of its "narrow vision", even arguing that the television series Mad Men handles the issues of conformity, frustration, and hypocrisy "with more panache and precision".

Top ten lists

The film appeared on several critics' top ten lists of the best films of 2008.
 1st – Mick LaSalle, San Francisco Chronicle
 2nd – Rex Reed, New York Observer
 6th – Peter Travers, Rolling Stone
 7th – Lou Lumenick, New York Post
 8th – James Berardinelli, ReelViews
 9th – David Denby, The New Yorker
 No order – Joe Neumaier, New York Daily News
 No order – Roger Ebert, Chicago Sun-Times (alphabetical top 20 list)

Awards and nominations

References

External links 
  (archive)
 
 
 
 
 

2008 drama films
2008 films
Adultery in films
American historical romance films
American romantic drama films
BBC Film films
British drama films
British historical romance films
British romantic drama films
DreamWorks Pictures films
2000s English-language films
Films about abortion
Films about depression
Films based on American novels
Films directed by Sam Mendes
Films featuring a Best Drama Actress Golden Globe-winning performance
Films produced by Sam Mendes
Films produced by Scott Rudin
Films scored by Thomas Newman
Films set in 1955
Films set in Connecticut
Films set in the 1940s
Films set in the 1950s
Films shot in Connecticut
Films with screenplays by Justin Haythe
Paramount Vantage films
2000s American films
2000s British films